Kerry Edward Reardon (born May 6, 1949) is a former American football cornerback in the National Football League. He was drafted by the Kansas City Chiefs in the sixth round of the 1971 NFL Draft. He played college football at Iowa.

See also 
 List of NCAA major college yearly punt and kickoff return leaders

References

1949 births
Living people
Players of American football from Kansas City, Missouri
American football cornerbacks
Iowa Hawkeyes football players
Kansas City Chiefs players